Neil Christopher Prakash (born 7 May 1991), known as Abu Khaled al-Cambodi, is a former member of the Islamic State group, whose Australian citizenship was revoked in December 2018. In April 2016, four civilians were killed in a United States air-strike targeting Prakash. In May 2016, he was reported to have been killed, but was only wounded and escaped. In November 2016, Prakash was captured in Turkey.

In March 2019, Prakash was convicted in a Turkish court of membership in a terrorist organisation and sentenced to seven and a half years in prison, reduced to six years on appeal. In early December 2022 he was extradited back to Australia, first to Darwin, then Melbourne where he was charged with terrorism-related offences.

History
Prakash was born in Melbourne, Australia to an Indo-Fijian father and a Cambodian mother from the south-east suburb of Springvale South. He attended high school at Cheltenham Secondary College. 

Prakash converted from Buddhism to Islam in August 2012 after a visit to Cambodia, when he was repulsed by what he viewed as Buddhism's commercialism and idolatry. He attended meetings at Al-Furqan bookstore and prayer centre in Melbourne.

On 29 December 2018, the Australian government announced it had revoked Prakash's Australian citizenship due to his links to terrorism. Although Australia maintains that he retains Fijian citizenship despite being born in Melbourne, in 2019, the Fijian government refused to allow him to go there, insisting he was not and had never been a Fijian citizen. Peter Dutton did not consult with Fiji or an expert in Fijian law before making the decision to revoke Prakash's Australian citizenship, and Fiji does not allow dual citizenship.

Islamic State
He traveled to Syria via Malaysia in 2013, arriving in the city of Raqqa.

Arrest warrant
Prakash's passport was cancelled October 2014. On 19 August 2015, police obtained a warrant for his arrest. He was accused of being a member of a terrorist organisation and of incursions into a foreign state with the intention of engaging in hostile activities.

IS media appearances
Prakash appeared in a video released 21 April 2015 titled "Stories From the Land of the Living: Abū Khālid al-Kambūdī" produced by al-Hayat Media Center.

Reports of death
On 5 May 2016, Attorney-General for Australia George Brandis said US officials had confirmed Prakash was killed in Mosul, but later news reports said police and intelligence agencies believed he might still be alive. It was later discovered that Prakash had been wounded in a strike, and then escaped to Syria.

Then on 29 July 2016, the United States Central Command said four civilians had been killed in a strike targeting Prakash on 29 April 2016.

Capture 
In November 2016, Prakash was captured in Turkey after he tried to cross the Syrian border into Turkey using false documents and a fake name. On 25 November 2016, Australian counter-terrorism officials confirmed that Prakash was still alive and had been arrested several weeks previously by Turkish officials in Turkey. Australia applied for his extradition on a Federal Police warrant for:

In May 2017, Prime Minister Malcolm Turnbull announced that Prakash was expected to be extradited from Turkey in months to stand trial in Australia.

In December 2018, Prakash was waiting on trial in Turkey on terrorism charges.

Conviction 
On 16 March 2019, Prakash was convicted in a Turkish court of membership in a terrorist organisation and sentenced to seven and a half years in prison.

In early December 2022 he was extradited back to Darwin. He was then extradited to Melbourne and charged in Melbourne Magistrates' Court with terrorism-related offences. Prakash is due to reappear in court in late February 2023.

References

1991 births
Living people
Australian Islamists
Islamic State of Iraq and the Levant members from Australia
Australian people of Indo-Fijian descent
Australian people of Cambodian descent
Converts to Islam from Buddhism
People who lost Australian citizenship
Fijian Muslims
Cambodian Muslims
Stateless people
Terrorism in Australia
People from Springvale, Victoria
Criminals from Melbourne